A spray bottle is a bottle that can squirt, spray or mist fluids.

History 
While spray bottles existed long before the middle of the 20th century, they used a rubber bulb which was squeezed to produce the spray; the quickly-moving air siphoned fluid from the bottle. The rapid improvement in plastics after World War II increased the range of fluids that could be dispensed, and reduced the cost of the sprayers because assembly could be fully automated.

The Drackett company, manufacturers of Windex glass cleaner, was a leader in promoting spray bottles. Roger Drackett raised soybeans, converted the soybeans to plastic using technology purchased from Henry Ford, and was an investor in the Seaquist company, an early manufacturer of sprayers and closures. Initially, the brittle nature of early plastics required that sprayers be packaged in a cardboard box, and the sprayer inserted in the glass Windex bottle by the consumer. The cost in the manufacturing sprayers was also a factor; consumers would reuse the sprayers with bottle after bottle of glass cleaner. As plastics improved and the cost of sprayers dropped, manufacturers were able to ship products with the sprayer already in the bottle.

In the late 1960s, spray bottles with trigger-style actuators appeared and quickly became popular, as this design was less fatiguing to use. The original pump-style bottle remained more popular for applications like non-aerosol deodorants, where size was a factor and repeated pumps were not required.

Modern spray bottles 
Unlike the rubber bulb dispenser which primarily moved air with a small amount of fluid, modern spray bottles use a positive displacement pump that acts directly on the fluid. The pump draws liquid up a siphon tube from the bottom of the bottle and forces it through a nozzle. Depending on the sprayer, the nozzle may or may not be adjustable, so as to select between squirting a stream, aerosolizing a mist, or dispensing a spray.

In a spray bottle, the dispensing is powered by the user's efforts, as opposed to the spray can, in which the user simply actuates a valve and product is dispensed under pressure.

Several designs have been developed.
Some of the pumping mechanisms of spray bottles are similar to those of pump dispensers which are used for more viscous products.

Examples

See also 
Aerosol spray
 Atomizer nozzle
 List of bottle types, brands and companies
Nebulizer
 Pesticide application
Spray nozzle
Squeeze bottle
 Water gun

References 

 Yam, K. L., "Encyclopedia of Packaging Technology", John Wiley & Sons, pp 275–276, 2009, 
 Soroka, W, "Fundamentals of Packaging Technology", IoPP, 2002,

Standards, ASTM International
D3890 Standard Test Method for Number of Strokes to Prime a Mechanical Pump Dispenser
D4041 Standard Practice for Determining Spray Patterns of Mechanical Pump Dispensers
D4333 Test Method for the Compatibility of Mechanical Pump Dispenser Components 
D4334 Standard Test Method for the Determination of the Dip Tube Retention of a Mechanical Pump Dispenser
D4335 Standard Test Method for Determination of Component Retention of a Mechanical Pump Dispenser
D4336 Standard Test Methods for Determination of the Output Per Stroke of a Mechanical Pump Dispenser
D6534 Standard Test Method for Determining the Peak Force-to-Actuate a Mechanical Pump Dispenser
D6535 Standard Test Method for Determining the Dip Tube Length of a Mechanical Pump Dispenser
D6536 Standard Test Method for Measuring the Dip Tube Length of a Mechanical Pump Dispenser
D6633 Standard Test Method for Basic Functional Stability of a Mechanical Pump Dispenser 
D6654 Standard Test Method for Basic Storage Stability of a Mechanical Pump Dispenser

External links 
 How Stuff Works

Bottles

fr:Pulvérisateur
ru:Пульверизатор